Ricardo Fabini Belhot (born 6 May 1967) is a Uruguayan sailor silver medallist in the Pan American Games, and World champion, Western Hemisphere champion and South American champion in the Snipe class.

Career

Olympic Games
 16th place in Soling at Barcelona 1992.
 30th place in Laser at Athens 1996.

Pan American Games
 2nd place in Snipe at Mar del Plata 1995.

World Championships
 1st place in Snipe at Saga 1989.

Notes

References

External links
 
 
 

1967 births
Living people
Olympic sailors of Uruguay
Pan American Games medalists in sailing
Pan American Games silver medalists for Uruguay
Sailors at the 1995 Pan American Games
Sailors at the 1992 Summer Olympics – Soling
Sailors at the 1996 Summer Olympics – Laser
Snipe class world champions
Uruguayan male sailors (sport)
World champions in sailing for Uruguay
Sailors at the 2019 Pan American Games
Medalists at the 2019 Pan American Games
20th-century Uruguayan people